Utva may refer to:

 Utva Aviation Industry, a Serbian aircraft manufacturer
 Utva (Perm Krai), a river in Perm Krai, Russia
 Utva (Ural), a river in Kazakhstan